Godrej BKC (Bandra-Kurla Complex) is a project by Godrej Properties Limited developed in partnership with Jet Airways located in Mumbai, India. The architectural partner is SOM (Skidmore, Owings and Merrill) and the construction was undertaken by L&T.

Currently, BKC is one of the most talked about central business hubs of Mumbai Metropolitan City. 

All of the major banks with their head offices are based in BKC.

BKC is also famous for its nightlife.

See also
 List of tallest structures in the Indian subcontinent
 List of tallest buildings in Mumbai
 Godrej Properties Limited

References

Bandra
Office buildings in Mumbai
Godrej Group